This is a list of rulers of Duklja.

List of rulers

Duklja continues as a crownland of Grand Principality of Serbia, under Vukan Nemanjić and Đorđe Nemanjić.

Rulers according to the Chronicle of the Priest of Duklja
The following rulers are mentioned only in the Chronicle of the Priest of Duklja (CPD), written by a Catholic monk of the Cistercian order by the name of Roger (Rudger) at the request of Croatian Ban Paul Šubić. It was written in two versions – the first one in Split in 1298 while Roger was handling the Archbishop of Split's finances, and the second ca. 1300, while he was the Archbishop of Antivari (Bar). The chronicle, built round a core written in Slavonic, but added to by a bishop of Bar intent on demonstrating his diocese' superiority over that of Split, is one of the oldest known written sources, but only Latin redactions from the 16th and 17th centuries have been preserved.

Historians have largely discounted it, though it contains material on the early history of the South Slavs. The work describes the Slavs as a peaceful people imported by the rulers of the Goths, who invaded the area in the 5th century, but it doesn't attempt to elaborate on how and when this happened. Furthermore, it mentions Bosnia (Bosnam) and Rascia (Rassa) as the two Serbian lands, while describing the southern Dalmatian Zahumlje, Travunia and Duklja (most of today's Herzegovina, Montenegro, as well as parts of Croatia and Albania) as Croatian lands in the Early Middle Ages - these contradict the Byzantine work De Administrando Imperio and other contemporary sources.

Various inaccurate or simply false claims make it an unreliable source. This work is, as the majority of modern historians think, mainly fictional, or wishful thinking, however, it does give us a unique insight into the whole era from the point of view of the indigenous Slavic population. One of the prime controversies of the Chronicle, lies in the fact that the Antivari Archepiscopate did not exist between 1142 and 1198 – and that is the time Rudger is supposed to have been the Archbishop.

See also
List of Serbian monarchs
List of rulers of Zeta
List of rulers of Montenegro

Notes

References

Sources
 Stephenson, Paul (July 2010). "Chronicle of the Priest of Duklja, Chapters 30-35". Translated Excerpts from Byzantine Sources. Paul Stephenson.
 
 
 
 

Duklja
 
 
Medieval Serbia
Serbia history-related lists
Montenegro history-related lists